Altyn Dala Conservation Initiative (ADCI) is the Government of Kazakhstan-led initiative to support the conservation of steppe and semi-desert ecosystems of Kazakhstan.

Background 
ADCI is jointly initiated by Association for the Conservation of the Biodiversity of Kazakhstan (ACBK), the Committee of Forestry and Wildlife of the Ministry of Agriculture (Kazakhstan), Frankfurt Zoological Society, Fauna and Flora International and the Royal Society for the Protection of Birds. The program includes the whole area of around 50 to 60 million hectares, which corresponds to the distribution range of the Betpak-Dala Saiga antelope community in Central Kazakhstan.

The effort also hopes to reintroduce the Turkmenian kulan and Przewalski's horse, although the primary focus has been on the conservation of native saiga populations.

Conservation of Kulans 
Currently, a program under ADCI is preparing a tiny population of endangered kulans for release into the wild. In 2017, a first batch of nine animals was released into an acclimatisation cage on the outskirts of the protected area of Altyn Dala. The creatures were carried 1200 kilometres by helicopter from Altyn-Emel National Park in the country's southeast.

References 

Ecological experiments
Nature reserves in Kazakhstan